MOS (Magnetic Organization System) is an American brand of organizational tools that use magnetism to manage cables and other magnetic items.

History 
The brand was formed through crowdfunding on Kickstarter in August 2012.  MOS has launched every subsequent product through the Kickstarter platform since.

Growth and expansion 
In January 2014 MOS released Spring, a line of phone and audio cables, as well as a miniaturized version of the original Magnetic Organization System called MOS Menos. Later in June 2014 MOS started another Kickstarter campaign for the Reach project which made its goal of $50,000 in the first day of the Kickstarter campaign. The Reach campaign was funded at 284 percent of the initial goal on July 26, 2014. MOS is a brand of Sewell Development Corp.

References

External links 
 MOS Homepage
 Apartment Therapy Explains MOS
 MOS Review by Cult of Mac
 Design Milk coverage of MOS Reach Kickstarter Project
 Gizmodo coverage of MOS Reach Kickstarter Project

Computer hardware companies